Shahrak-e Mohammad Reza Asadpur (also Romanized as Shahrak-e Moḩammad Rez̤ā Āsadpūr) is a village in Abezhdan Rural District, Abezhdan District, Andika County, Khuzestan Province, Iran. At the 2006 census, its population was 1,045, in 167 families.

References 

Populated places in Andika County